Maling may refer to:

Buildings 
 Maling station, a station in the Shenzhen Metro system
 Maling Temple, a temple in Houlong Township, Taiwan
 West Maling, a heritage-listed building in New South Wales, Australia
 Maling River Shankun Expressway Bridge, a bridge in Guizhou Province, China

Geography 
 Maling, Nepal, a village in Lamjung District, Nepal
 Maling Peak, a mountain in Coronation Island, Antarctica
 Maling River, a river in Guanxi Province, China

Film and literature 
 "Alas, Poor Maling", 1940 short story by Graham Greene
 Maling Kutang, 2009 Indonesian comedy film
 Mayavi Maling, 2018 Hindi television series

Other 
 Maling pottery, pottery in northeast England
 Maling Road, Melbourne, a shopping district in Canterbury, Australia
 Battle of Maling, a battle in 342 BC during the Warring States period

See also 
 Maling (surname)